MEHS may refer to:
 Maynard Evans High School, Orlando, Florida, United States
 Mount Eden High School, Hayward, California, United States
 Mount Edgecumbe High School, Sitka, Alaska, United States